12 Metre World Championship is a World Championship sailing regatta in the 12 Metre class organised by the International 12 Metre Association (Website).

Editions

Medalists

References

12 Metre competitions
World championships in sailing
Recurring sporting events established in 1979